The 6th Mountain Division was a German army Division of World War II. It was established in June 1940, and was deployed to France for occupation duties. In December it was relocated to Poland, where it remained until the spring of 1941. It then took part in Operation Marita, the invasion of Greece during the Balkans Campaign. In September it was relocated to northern Finland, where it operated in Lapland (west of Murmansk). From July 1942 onward it was part of the 20th Mountain Army along the Arctic coast. It withdrew into Norway when the Germans evacuated Finland in late 1944, and surrendered to the British at the end of the war in 1945.

Commanding officers 
 Generalmajor Ferdinand Schörner (1 June 1940 - 1 February 1942)
 Generalleutnant Christian Philipp (1 February 1942 - 20 August 1944)
 Generalmajor Max-Josef Pemsel (20 August 1944 - 19 April 1945)
 Oberst Josef Remold (20 April 1945 - capitulation)

Order of battle 
As of 1 June 1940 (day of formation):

 141st Gebirgsjäger Regiment
 143rd Gebirgsjäger Regiment
 118th Mountain Artillery Regiment
 112th Reconnaissance Battalion
 47th Panzerjäger Battalion
 91st Pioneer Battalion
 91st Signals Battalion
 91st Divisional Support Units

As of January 1941:

 141st Gebirgsjäger Regiment
 143rd Gebirgsjäger Regiment
 112th (tmot) Reconnaissance Battalion
 47th Panzerjäger Battalion
 85th Light (Luftwaffe) FlaK Battery
 118th Mountain Artillery Regiment
 Gebirgs-Pionier-Battalion 91
 91st Signals Battalion
 Divisional Service Troops

References 
 Pipes, Jason. "6th Gebirgsjager Division". Retrieved May 11, 2005.
 "6. Gebirgs-Division". German language article at www.lexikon-der-wehrmacht.de. Retrieved May 11, 2005.

6
Military units and formations established in 1940
Military units and formations disestablished in 1945